René Paul Robert (December 31, 1948 – June 22, 2021) was a Canadian professional ice hockey winger who played 12 seasons in the National Hockey League (NHL). He played for the Toronto Maple Leafs, Pittsburgh Penguins, Buffalo Sabres, and Colorado Rockies from 1970 to 1982. He made two All-Star appearances and was selected as the second NHL All-Star team right wing in 1974–75.  He also played in the 1975 Stanley Cup Finals with the Sabres, in which he scored the game-winning goal in Game 3.

Early life
Robert was born in Trois-Rivières, on December 31, 1948.  As a youth, he played in the 1961 Quebec International Pee-Wee Hockey Tournament with Trois-Rivières.  While playing for the Trois-Rivieres Maple Leafs of the Quebec Junior A Hockey League in 1967–68, he set the QJAHL record with 69 goals in 49 games, a record that has subsequently been broken.  He was signed by the Toronto Maple Leafs to a five-game tryout contract on March 20, 1968.

Playing career
Robert made his NHL debut with the Maple Leafs in 1970–71.  He played five games during his first season and did not record any points.  He was claimed by the Pittsburgh Penguins on June 8, 1971, in the NHL Intra-League Draft.  He played most of the 1971–72 season with that franchise until he was traded to the Buffalo Sabres for Eddie Shack on March 4, 1972.  He was subsequently placed in the same forward line as center Gilbert Perreault and left winger Rick Martin, and the trio became known as The French Connection. A statue of the famous forward line, unveiled in 2012, is located in front the Sabres arena, KeyBank Center.

In his first season with the Sabres, Robert led the franchise in goals with 40, and he was named to his first NHL All-Star Game.  The team then unexpectedly advanced to the 1973 Stanley Cup playoffs, with Robert scoring the franchise's first overtime goal on April 10, 1973, in Game 5 against the Montreal Canadiens, who went on to win the series.  Robert's best offensive season came during the 1974–75 season, when he recorded 40 goals and 60 assists for 100 points.  It was the Sabres' first 100-point season by an individual, and he was also named to the second NHL All-Star team that year.  In Game 3 of the 1975 Stanley Cup Finals, dubbed the "Fog Game", Robert scored after 18:29 of overtime against the Philadelphia Flyers to help the Sabres win their first game of the series.  The Flyers ultimately clinched the Cup in six games.  Robert led the league in games played (80) and hat-tricks (3) the following season.  He was traded to the Colorado Rockies on October 5, 1979, in exchange for defenceman John Van Boxmeer.  Robert was named captain of the Rockies, before being traded on January 30, 1981, to the Maple Leafs, with whom he played his final season in 1981–82.  He finished his NHL career with 744 games, recording 284 goals and 418 assists for 702 points.

Later life
After retiring from professional ice hockey, Robert acted as president of the NHL Alumni Association.  He was inducted into the Buffalo Sabres Hall of Fame along with Perreault and Martin in 1989.  His number 14 was retired by the Sabres on November 15, 1995, along with Rick Martin's number 7 jersey.  They were reunited with Perreault whose number 11 was retired in a 1990 ceremony.

Robert divided his time between Western New York and Florida.  The driveway at his home in Buffalo was constructed from pieces of the Buffalo Memorial Auditorium after its demolition in 2009.  He had a heart attack on June 18, 2021, and was placed on life support.  He died four days later on June 22 at a hospital in Port Charlotte, Florida, at the age of 72.

Career statistics
Source:

Regular season and playoffs

References

External links
 

1948 births
2021 deaths
Buffalo Sabres players
Canadian expatriate ice hockey players in the United States
Canadian ice hockey right wingers
Colorado Rockies (NHL) players
French Quebecers
Ice hockey people from Quebec
National Hockey League players with retired numbers
Phoenix Roadrunners (WHL) players
Pittsburgh Penguins players
Rochester Americans players
Sportspeople from Trois-Rivières
Toronto Maple Leafs players
Tulsa Oilers (1964–1984) players
Vancouver Canucks (WHL) players